The 1926 UCI Road World Championships took place in Milan, Italy on 29 July 1926.

Events summary

Medal table

Results
The course was 183 km from Milan to Torino. There were 44 participants.

See also
 1926 UCI Track Cycling World Championships

References

UCI Road World Championships by year
W
R
R
Sports competitions in Milan
UCI Road World Championships
1920s in Milan